Citrobacter gillenii is a species of Gram-negative bacteria.

References

Further reading

External links

LPSN
Type strain of Citrobacter gillenii at BacDive -  the Bacterial Diversity Metadatabase

gillenii
Bacteria described in 1999